Girard Township is a township in Otter Tail County, Minnesota, United States. The population was 697 at the 2000 census.

Girard Township was organized in 1882.

Geography

Demographics
At the 2000 census there were 697 people, 293 households, and 232 families living in the township. The racial makeup of the township was 99.00% White, 0.14% African American, 0.14% Native American, and 0.72% from two or more races.
Of the 293 households 21.2% had children under the age of 18 living with them, 75.4% were married couples living together, 2.4% had a female householder with no husband present, and 20.8% were non-families. 20.1% of households were one person and 10.2% were one person aged 65 or older. The average household size was 2.38 and the average family size was 2.70.

The age distribution was 19.4% under the age of 18, 4.4% from 18 to 24, 17.9% from 25 to 44, 34.3% from 45 to 64, and 24.0% 65 or older. The median age was 52 years. For every 100 females, there were 106.2 males. For every 100 females age 18 and over, there were 103.6 males.

The median household income was $41,500 and the median family income  was $46,827. Males had a median income of $31,875 versus $26,563 for females. The per capita income for the township was $19,295. About 4.7% of families and 8.8% of the population were below the poverty line, including 12.6% of those under age 18 and 1.4% of those age 65 or over.

References

Townships in Otter Tail County, Minnesota
Townships in Minnesota